Claude-Ursule Gency (13 June 1765, Meulan - 6 January 1845) was a French general of the French Revolutionary Wars and Napoleonic Wars.

1765 births
1845 deaths
People from Meulan-en-Yvelines
French generals
Republican military leaders of the War in the Vendée
Military leaders of the French Revolutionary Wars
French military personnel of the French Revolutionary Wars
French military personnel of the Napoleonic Wars